Charles Sherborne Barnett (24 February 1884, in Cheltenham, Gloucestershire – 20 November 1962, in Gloucester, Gloucestershire) was an English cricketer who played for Gloucestershire.

He also played football for his local team Cheltenham Town in the early 1900s with his brother Edgar

External links
 

English cricketers
Gloucestershire cricketers
1884 births
1962 deaths
Sportspeople from Cheltenham
Cheltenham Town F.C. players
Association footballers not categorized by position
English footballers